Mary  is a feminine given name, the English form of the name Maria, which was in turn a Latin form of the Greek name  or , found in the Septuagint and New Testament. The latter reflects the original Hebrew pronunciation of the name  (Masoretic pronunciation ), as attested by the Septuagint. The vowel "a" in a closed unaccented syllable later became "i", as seen in other names such as "Bil'am" (Balaam) and "Shimshon" (Samson).

Etymology

The name may have originated from the Egyptian language; it is likely derivative of the root , meaning "love; beloved" (compare , "Merit-Amun", i.e. "beloved of Amun").

St. Jerome (writing ), following Eusebius of Caesarea, translates the name as "drop of the sea" ( in Latin), from the Hebrew  (cf.

This translation was subsequently rendered  ("star of the sea") due to scribal error, whence Our Lady's title Star of the Sea.

Rashi, an 11th-century Jewish commentator on the Bible, wrote that the name was given to the sister of Moses because of the Egyptians' harsh treatment of Jews in Egypt. Rashi wrote that the Israelites lived in Egypt for 210 years, including 86 years of cruel enslavement that began at the time Moses' elder sister was born. Therefore, the girl was called Miriam, because the Egyptians made life bitter for her people.

Usage

Modern given names derived from Aramaic Maryam are frequent in Christian culture, as well as, due to the Quranic tradition of Mary, extremely frequently given in Islamic cultures.

Possible use of Maria as a Christian given name is recorded for the third century.

The English form Mary arises by adoption of French  into Middle English.

Wycliffe's Bible still has Marie, with the modern spelling current from the 16th century, found in the Tyndale Bible (1525), Coverdale Bible (1535) and later translations.

Mary is still among the top 100 names for baby girls born in Ireland, common amongst Christians there and also popularised amongst Protestants specifically, with regard to Queen Mary II, co-monarch and wife of William III. Mary was the 179th most popular name for girls born in England and Wales in 2007, ranking behind other versions of the name.

In the United States, Mary was consistently the most popular name for girls from 1880 until 1961. It first fell below the top 100 most popular names in 2009. By contrast, the latinate (especially Spanish) form  rose into the top 100 in 1944, peaking at rank 31 in the 1970s, but also falling below rank 100 once again in 2012.

The name Mary remains more popular in the Southern United States than elsewhere in the country. Mary was the 15th most popular name for girls born in Alabama in 2007, the 22nd most popular name for girls born in Mississippi in 2007, the 44th most popular name for girls in North Carolina, the 33rd most popular name for girls in South Carolina, and the 26th most popular name for girls in Tennessee.

Mary was still the most common name for women and girls in the United States in the 1990 census.

Mariah had a short-lived burst of popularity after 1990, when singer Mariah Carey first topped the charts, peaking at rank 62 in 1998.

Molly, a pet form, was ranked as the 29th most popular name there and spelling variant Mollie at No. 107; Maria was ranked at No. 93; Maryam was ranked at No. 116 as of 2007.

People

Biblical figures 
 New Testament people named Mary:
 Mary, mother of Jesus
 Mary Magdalene, a disciple of Jesus
 Mary of Bethany, a follower of Jesus, considered by Western medieval tradition to be Mary Magdalene
 Mary of Clopas, a follower of Jesus
 Mary, mother of James the younger (or lesser)
 Mary, mother of John Mark
 Mary of Rome
 Salome (disciple), a follower of Jesus, in medieval tradition Mary Salome

Royalty 
 Mary of Woodstock (1278–1332), daughter of King Edward I of England
 Mary, Queen of Hungary (1371–1395), Queen of Hungary and Croatia, daughter of Louis I the Great of Hungary
 Mary Tudor, Queen of France (1496–1533), daughter of Henry VII of England
 Mary of Guise (1515–1560), Queen Consort of James V of Scotland and mother of Mary, Queen of Scots
 Mary I of England (1516–1558)
 Mary, Queen of Scots (1542–1587), mother of James I of England
 Princess Mary of England (1605–1607), daughter of James VI and I
 Mary, Princess Royal and Princess of Orange (1631–1660), daughter of Charles I of England
 Mary of Modena (1658–1718), Queen Consort of King James II of England and VII of Scotland
 Queen Mary II of England (1662–1694), daughter of James VII and II, Queen of England, Scotland and Ireland, wife of King William III and joint ruler with him
 Princess Mary of Great Britain (1723–1772), daughter of George II of Great Britain
 Princess Mary, Duchess of Gloucester and Edinburgh (1776–1857), daughter of George III of the United Kingdom
 Princess Mary Adelaide of Cambridge (1833–1897), granddaughter of George III of the United Kingdom
 Mary of Teck (1867–1953), Queen Consort of King George V of the United Kingdom
 Mary, Princess Royal and Countess of Harewood (1897–1965), daughter of George V of the United Kingdom
 Mary, Crown Princess of Denmark (born 1972), Australian-born wife of Frederik, Crown Prince of Denmark

Non-royal aristocrats 
 Mary, Countess of Blois (1200–1241), daughter of Walter of Avesnes and Margaret of Blois
 Mary of Guelders, daughter of Arnold, Duke of Guelders
 Mary of Burgundy (1457–1482), daughter of Charles the Bold, Duke of Burgundy

Others 
 Mary (slave) (died 1838), an American teenage slave executed for murder
 Mary Abbott (artist) (1921–2019), American artist
 Mary Abbott (golfer) (1857–1904), American golfer
 Mary Bethune Abbott (1823–1898), wife of Sir John Abbott, the third Prime Minister of Canada
 Mary Ogden Abbott (1894–1981), American artist, traveler and equestrian
 Mary Adams (activist) (born 1938), tax activist who led the repeal of Maine's statewide property tax and efforts to enact a Taxpayer Bill of Rights
 Mary Adams (actress) (1910–1973), American actress
 Mary Adams (broadcaster) (1898–1984), administrator who helped to develop the BBC's television service in the 1950s
 Mary Adams (codebreaker) (codebreaker, 1922–2010), Scottish interceptor for Bletchley Park during World War II
 Mary Adams (educator) (1823–1898), Canadian women's education reformer
 Mary Jane Adams (1840–1902), Irish poet
 Mary Kay Adams (born 1962), American television actress
 Mary Kawennatakie Adams (1917–1999), First Nations basketmaker
 Mary Newbury Adams (1837–1901), American women's suffragist and education advocate–
 Mary Ajami (1888–1965), Syrian writer
 Mary Baker (1842–1856), English painter
 Mary Ann Baker (1831–1921), American composer and singer
 Mary E. Baker (1923–1995), African-American community activist
 Mary Landon Baker (1901–1961), American socialite and heiress famous for her romantic life
 Mary Lou Baker (1914–1965), member of the Florida House of Representatives and women's rights activist
 Bonnie Baker (baseball) (Mary Geraldine Baker, 1918–2003), American baseball player
 Mary Beard (classicist) (born 1955), English scholar of Ancient Rome
 Mary Ritter Beard (1876–1958), American historian, author, women's suffrage activist, and women's history archivist
 Mary Lincoln Beckwith (1898–1975), prominent descendant of Abraham Lincoln
 Mary Kay Bergman (1961–1999), American voice actress
 Mary E. Black (1895–1988), American-Canadian occupational therapist, teacher, master weaver and writer
 Mary J. L. Black (1879-1939), Canadian librarian and suffragist
 Mary Borgstrom (1916–2019), Canadian potter, ceramist, and artist
 Mary Bright (1954–2002), Scottish curtain designer
 Mary Lee Cagle (1864–1955), married name Mary Harris, pastor
 Mary Carey, Lady Carey, author and poet
 Mary L. Coloe (born 1949), biblical scholar
 Mary Costa (born 1930), American opera singer and actress
 Mary Lincoln Crume (1775–), aunt of American President Abraham Lincoln
 Moll Davis, actress and mistress of Charles II of Great Britain
 Mary Davis (actress), American silent film actress
 Mary Davis (artist) (1866–1941), English artist
 Mary E. P. Davis (1840–1924), American nursing instructor
 Mary Davis (activist) (born 1954), Special Olympics organiser and candidate in the Irish presidential election, 2011
 Mary Bond Davis (born 1958), American singer, actor and dancer
 Mary Gould Davis (1882–1956), American author, librarian, storyteller and editor
 Mary Lund Davis (1922–2008), modernist architect
 Mary Davis, singer of the S.O.S. Band
 Mary Baker Eddy (1821–1910), born Mary Baker, founder of Christian Science
 Mary Fuller (1888–1973), American Silent Film Actress
 Mary Fuller (sculptor) (1922–2022), American sculptor and art historian
 Mimi Gardner Gates (born 1943), American art historian who is the recent director of the Seattle Art Museum, stepmother of Bill Gates
 Mary Maxwell Gates (1929–1994), American businesswoman, executive, civic activist, and school teacher, mother of Bill Gates
 Mary Gennoy (1951–2004), American activist
 Mary Grant (politician) (1928–2016), Ghanaian politician
 Mary Grant (sculptor) (1831–1908), British sculptor
 Mary E. Grant (born 1953), American psychiatric nurse and politician
 Mary Pollock Grant (1876–1957), Scottish suffragette, politician, missionary and policewoman
 Liz Grant (Mary Elizabeth Grant, born 1930), former Australian pharmacist and politician
 Mary Styles Harris (born 1949), geneticist
 Mel Harris (Mary Ellen Harris, born 1956), actress
 Mary Harris (musician), member of the music group Ambrosia
 Mary Packer Harris (1891–1978), Scottish artist and art teacher
 Mary Harris (cricketer), New Zealand cricketer
 Mary Johnson Harris (born 1963), member of the Louisiana Board of Elementary and Secondary Education 
 Mary Winifred Harris, Clerk of the New Zealand House of Representatives
 Mary Harris (murderer), American murderer
 Mary Harron (b. 1953), Canadian film director and screenwriter
 Mary Harron (actress), silent film era actress, sister of Harrons John and Robert also silent era actors
 Mary Henderson (journalist) (1919–2004), Greek-born British journalist and host
 Mary H. J. Henderson (1874–1938), administrator with World War I Scottish Women's Hospitals for Foreign Service
 Mary Dorothea Heron, first woman to be admitted to the Roll of Solicitors in Ireland
 Mary MacLean Hindmarsh, Australian botanist
 Mary Hinton (actress) (1896–1979), British actress
 Mary Dana Hinton, American university administrator
 Mary Hilliard Hinton (1869–1961), American historian, painter, and anti-suffragist
 Sister Mary Melanie Holliday (1850–1939), American Catholic nun
 Mary Hottinger (1893–1978), Scottish translator and author
 Mary Ingalls (1865–1928), older sister of author Laura Ingalls Wilder
 Mary E. Ireland (1834–1927), American author, translator, poet
 Mamie Lincoln Isham (1869–1938), granddaughter of Abraham Lincoln
 Mary Jackson (Richmond Bread Riot), leader of Richmond Bread Riot of 1863
 Mary Anna Jackson (1831–1915), wife of Confederate Army general Thomas "Stonewall" Jackson
 Mary E. Jackson (1867–1923), African-American suffrage activist, YWCA leader and writer
 Mary Percy Jackson (1904–2000), Canadian medical doctor
 Mary Jackson (actress) (1910–2005), film and television actress
 Mary Jackson (engineer) (1921–2005), NASA engineer
 Mary Ann Jackson (1923–2003), child actress
 Mary Jackson (artist) (born 1945), African-American fiber artist
 Mary M. Jackson ( 1980s–2010s), American Navy vice admiral
 Mary Jemison (1743–1833), British frontierswoman
 Mary Johnson (first lady), first lady of California
 Mary Johnson (actress) (1896–1975), Swedish silent film performer
 Mary Johnson (singer) (1898–1983), African American lowdown blues singer
 Mary Johnson (cricketer) (born 1924), English cricketer
 Mary Lea Johnson (1926–1990), American theatrical producer, entrepreneur and philanthropist
 Mary Johnson (activist) (born 1948), American advocate for disability rights; founded Ragged Edge magazine
 Mary Johnson (writer) (born 1958), American writer and Director of A Room of Her Own Foundation
 Mary Johnson (politician), member of the North Dakota House of Representatives
 Mary C. Johnson, one of the first three females to practice law in Georgia
 Mary Jane Richardson Jones, American suffragist and activist from Chicago
 Mary Lee (1921–2022), Scottish singer
 Mary Johnson Bailey Lincoln (1844–1921), American science teacher
 Mary Harlan Lincoln (1846–1937), daughter of James Harlan, wife of Robert Todd Lincoln, daughter-in-law of Abraham Lincoln
 Mary Todd Lincoln (1818–1882), former First Lady of the United States, wife of Abraham Lincoln
 Mary Johnson Lowe (1924–1999), American jurist
 Mary Martin (1913–1990), American actress and singer
 Mary Baker McQuesten (1849–1934), Canadian activist
 Maybelle Stephens Mitchell (Mary Isabel Stephens Mitchell; 1872–1919), American suffragist
 Mary Money (died 1905), English female murder victim
 Mary Morton (1879–1965), British sculptor
 Mary K. Okheena (born 1957), Inuvialuit graphic artist
 Mary-Kate Olsen (born 1986), American fashion designer and former child actress
 Mary Paischeff (1899–1975), Finnish ballerina
 Mary Felicia Perera (born 1944), Sri Lankan Sinhala cinema actress
 Mary Pudlat (1923–2001), Canadian Inuk artist
 Mary Quigley (1960–1977), American murder victim
 Mary Quin, American businesswoman
 Mary Rambaran-Olm, specialist in the literature and history of early medieval England
 Mary Ramsey (born 1963), American singer-songwriter
 Mary Ramsey (died 1601), English philanthropist
 Mary Rice (wheelchair racer), Irish paralympic athlete
 Mary Roberts (author) (1788–1864), author, born London
 Mary Fanton Roberts (1864–1956), American journalist
 Mary Helen Roberts (born 1947), American politician in the state of Washington
 Mary Wendy Roberts (born 1944), American politician in the state of Oregon
 Mary Louise Roberts (1886–1968), New Zealand masseuse, physiotherapist and mountaineer
 Mary Grant Roberts (1841–1921), Australian zoo owner
 Cokie Roberts (1943–2019), real name Mary Roberts, American journalist and author
 Mary Roos (born 1949), German singer
 Mary Jane Seacole (1805–1881), British-Jamaican nurse, healer and businesswoman.
 Mary Anne Schwalbe (1934–2009), university administrator and refugee worker
 Mary Shelley (1797–1851), English novelist who wrote the Frankenstein; or, The Modern Prometheus
 Mary Silvani (1948–1982), American murder victim
 Mary Craig Sinclair (1882–1961), American writer and the wife of Upton Sinclair
 Mary Florence Wells Slater (1864–1941), American entomologist and schoolteacher
 Mary Lou Spiess (1931–1992), American designer of disabled fashion
 Margaret Truman (Mary Margaret Truman, 1924–2008), only daughter of Harry S. Truman
 Mary Anne MacLeod Trump (1912–2000), mother of Donald Trump
 Mary L. Trump (born 1965), psychologist and author; niece of Donald Trump
 Mary Frances Tucker (1837–1902), American poet
 Mary van Kleeck (1883–1972), American social scientist and socialist
 Mary Burke Washington (1926–2014), American economist
 Mary Ball Washington (1708–1789), mother of U.S. President George Washington
 Mary Helen Washington, American literary scholar
 Mary L. Washington (born 1962), Maryland legislator
 Mary T. Washington (1906–2005), first African-American woman to be a certified public accountant in the United States
 Mary Wollstonecraft (1759–1797), English writer and founding feminist philosopher

See also
 
 Mary Jo
 Marian (given name)
 Máire
 Marion
 Muire
 Molly
 Polly
 Saint Mary (disambiguation)

References

Citations

General sources 
 Rosenkrantz, Linda and Satran, Pamela Redmond (2005). Beyond Jennifer and Jason, Madison and Montana, Fourth Edition. St. Martin's Paperbacks. .
 Todd, Loreto (1998). Celtic Names for Children. Irish American Book Company. .
 Wallace, Carol (2004). The Penguin Classic Baby Name Book. Penguin. .
 Wood, Jamie Martinez (2001). ¿Cómo te llamas, Baby? Berkley. .

English feminine given names
Feminine given names
Given names of Greek language origin
Given names
Irish feminine given names
Scottish feminine given names
Welsh feminine given names